Kasugano (written: 春日野) is a family name in the Japanese language and may refer to:

 Kasugano stable, is a stable of sumo wrestlers
 Nara Kasugano International Forum Iraka
 Yachiyo Kasugano, former member of the musical theater troupe Takarazuka Revue

Fictional characters
 Haruka Kasugano, a main character in the anime/visual novel Yosuga No Sora
 Sora Kasugano, one of the supporting characters in the anime/visual novel Yosuga No Sora
 Hiyori Kasugano, one of the supporting characters in the anime/manga series Sketchbook: Full Color's
 Midori Kasugano, a main character in the anime Midori Days
 Haruka Kasugano, one of the supporting characters in the anime Midori Days
 Nene Kasugano, one of the supporting characters in the anime Potemayo
 Anishazu Kasugano, the supporting characters in the anime Potemayo
 Kira Kasugano, one of the supporting characters in the anime Potemayo
 Ray Kasugano, a main character in the anime/manga series Ray
 Dr. Kasugano, one of the supporting characters in the anime/manga series Ray
 Sakura Kasugano, one of the supporting characters in the anime/video game series Street Fighter
 Shion Kasugano, one of the supporting characters in the anime series Star-Myu
 Sumire Kasugano, one of the supporting characters in the anime/manga series Mahou Tsukai Sally
 Tsubaki Kasugano, one of the supporting characters in the anime Mirai Nikki
 Urara Kasugano, one of the main characters in the anime Sabagebu!
 Urara Kasugano, one of the main characters in the anime series Yes! Pretty Cure 5
 Heizou Kasugano, one of the supporting characters in the anime series Yes! Pretty Cure 5
 Michelle Kasugano, one of the supporting characters in the anime series Yes! Pretty Cure 5

Japanese-language surnames